Scott Henry may refer to:

Scott Henry (cricketer) (born 1989), Australian cricketer
Scott Henry (golfer) (born 1987), Scottish golfer
Scott Henry (vine training system)

Henry, Scott